Murat Kalkan (born 20 May 1986 in Bayburt, Turkey) is a Turkish footballer. He currently plays as a left wingback for Kastamonuspor.

External links
 
 

1986 births
Living people
People from Bayburt
Turkish footballers
Gençlerbirliği S.K. footballers
Orduspor footballers
Adana Demirspor footballers
Konyaspor footballers
Mersin İdman Yurdu footballers
Süper Lig players
Turkey under-21 international footballers
TFF First League players
Association football defenders